Just for One Day may refer to:


Music
"Just for One Day (Heroes)", a track by electronic music artist David Guetta
"Just for One Day", a track by pop group the Grace from their 2007 album Graceful 4

Other uses
Just for One Day (film), an Ethiopian documentary picture
Just for One Day - Run for Free College, a part of the broader Kahit Isang Araw Lang Unity Run series
Just for One Day: Adventures in Britpop, a book by musician and writer Louise Wener

See also
Just One Day (disambiguation)